Shamtuch (Russian and Tajik: Шамтуч) is a village and jamoat in north-west Tajikistan. It is located in Ayni District in Sughd Region. The jamoat has a total population of 6,557 (2015). It consists of 5 villages: Darg, Shamtuch, Kazdon, Utogar and Veshab.

References

Populated places in Sughd Region
Jamoats of Tajikistan